The Lovely Bones is a 2009 supernatural thriller drama film directed by Peter Jackson from a screenplay he co-wrote with Fran Walsh and Philippa Boyens. It is based on Alice Sebold's 2002 novel of the same name and stars Saoirse Ronan, Mark Wahlberg, Rachel Weisz, Susan Sarandon, Stanley Tucci and Michael Imperioli. The plot follows a girl who is murdered and watches over her family from "the in-between" and is torn between seeking vengeance on her killer and allowing her family to heal.

An international co-production between the United States, the United Kingdom, and New Zealand, the film was produced by Carolynne Cunningham, Walsh, Jackson, and Aimee Peyronnet, with Steven Spielberg, Tessa Ross, Ken Kamins, and James Wilson as executive producers. Principal photography began in October 2007 in New Zealand and Pennsylvania. The film's score was composed by Brian Eno.

The Lovely Bones was first released on December 26, 2009, in New Zealand, and then internationally in January 2010. The film's North American release date was changed multiple times, with a limited release on December 11, 2009, and a wider release on January 15, 2010. It was released to mixed reviews from critics; the story and its message were generally criticized, with praise mainly aimed at the visual effects, Peter Jackson's direction, and the performances of Ronan and Tucci. In the film's opening weekend, in limited release, it grossed $116,616, despite only having been screened in three theaters, placing it at 30th place on the box office chart. The Lovely Bones grossed over $44 million in North America. The film also received numerous accolades, with Tucci being nominated for the Academy Award for Best Supporting Actor.

Plot
In 1973, 14-year-old high school freshman, Susie Salmon, dreams of becoming a photographer. One day, Ray, a boy she has a crush on, asks her out. As Susie walks home through a cornfield, she runs into her neighbor, George Harvey, who coaxes her into an underground "kid's hideout" he has built. Inside, Susie grows uncomfortable and attempts to leave; Harvey grabs her and the scene fades until she is seen rushing past her alarmed classmate Ruth Connors, seemingly fleeing Harvey's den.

The Salmons become worried when Susie fails to return home from school. Her father, Jack, searches for her, while her mother, Abigail waits for the police. In town, Susie sees Jack, who does not respond to her when she calls. Susie runs home to find Harvey soaking in a bathtub. After seeing the bloody bathroom and her bracelet hanging on the sink faucet, Susie realizes she never escaped the underground hideout because Harvey murdered her. Screaming, she is pulled into the "In-Between", which is neither Heaven nor Earth. From there, Susie watches over her loved ones, and resists her new afterlife friend Holly's urging her to let go.

Investigating Susie's disappearance with Detective Fenerman, Jack believes Susie was murdered by someone she knew. He researches neighbors and eventually suspects Harvey is the killer. Fenerman is unable to find proof, as Harvey has carefully concealed the evidence. Susie's sister, Lindsey, agrees with Jack's suspicions, but their casework takes a toll on Abigail. Abigail's alcoholic mother, Lynn, moves into the house. Feeling alienated from her husband, Abigail goes to California. Susie, in her afterlife, learns that Harvey, who has targeted Lindsey as his next victim, has murdered six other girls, including Holly, and that he stuffed Susie's body into a large safe in his basement.

One night, Jack, carrying a baseball bat, trails Harvey into the cornfield. However, Jack accidentally stumbles across a teen couple named Clarissa and Brian. Brian, thinking they will be assaulted, bludgeons Jack nearly to death as Harvey watches nearby while Clarissa begs him to stop. As Jack recuperates, Lindsey breaks into Harvey's house looking for evidence that he killed Susie. Upstairs, she finds a notebook containing a sketch of the underground den, a lock of Susie's hair, and news articles about Susie's disappearance. Harvey returns and almost catches Lindsey, but she escapes and rushes home to discover that her mother has returned. She gives the notebook to her grandmother, who contacts the police. Harvey has already fled his home – taking the safe containing Susie's body with him.

Susie's afterlife begins expanding into a larger heaven, and she is greeted by Harvey's other victims. She resists Holly's urging her to enter Heaven along with the others, claiming she has one final thing to do. Meanwhile, Susie's classmates Ruth and Ray are present when Harvey drives up to dispose of the safe at a sinkhole dump site on the Conners' property. Susie returns to Earth and enters Ruth's body, causing Ruth to faint. Ray rushes to Ruth's aid only to realize she has become Susie. They kiss, completing Susie's last wish, and she returns to Heaven. Meanwhile, Harvey dumps the safe in the sinkhole, leaving it to disappear in the muddy water as he drives away.

Sometime later, Harvey meets a young woman outside a diner and offers her a ride, but she rejects him and leaves. A large icicle falls from an overhead branch, hitting Harvey's shoulder, causing him to fall backward over a steep cliff to his death. Time passes, and Susie sees that her family is healing, which Susie refers to as "the lovely bones" that grew around her absence. Susie finally enters Heaven, telling the audience: "My name is Salmon, like the fish; first name Susie. I was 14 years old when I was murdered on December 6, 1973. I was here for a moment and then I was gone. I wish you all a long and happy life."

Cast
 Saoirse Ronan as Susie Salmon, the main character and narrator. She is a 14-year-old girl, who is killed by her neighbor. Ronan was also 14 years old at the time of her casting and filming. Ronan and her family were originally reluctant for Ronan to accept the role because of the film's subject matter, but agreed after meeting with Jackson.
 Evelyn Lennon as Susie at age 3
 Mark Wahlberg as Jack Salmon, Susie's father, who becomes obsessed with his daughter's murder case. Wahlberg stated that his role in the film encouraged him to be a more cautious parent with his three children and to talk to them more about "not talking to strangers." Before Wahlberg's casting, Ryan Gosling was set to play the role but dropped out of the film in October 2007, one month before filming. Gosling had gained weight and grown a beard for the role, but said, "The age of the character versus my real age [of twenty-six] was always a concern of mine. Peter [Jackson] and I tried to make it work and ultimately it just didn't. I think the film is much better off with Mark Wahlberg in that role." Gosling later admitted that the real reason for his firing was that he had arrived for filming 60 lbs. overweight and sporting a beard, without having discussed the physical change with Jackson.
 Rachel Weisz as Abigail Salmon, Susie's mother. After Susie's murder, Abigail despairs and abandons the family. Weisz stated that playing the character and the film and novel's "uplifting theme" made her look at life as a "treasure" and the film gave her a "positive feeling" rather than a "depressed" one.
 Susan Sarandon as Grandma Lynn, Susie's grandmother. Sarandon stated that her character is like a "comic relief" and that her character deals with the pain of Susie's death by drinking, smoking and shooting guns.
 Stanley Tucci as George Harvey, a serial killer who murdered Susie. Tucci stated that he had researched his role by watching documentaries and reading books by criminal profiler John E. Douglas about catching serial killers. Tucci stated that his wife, Kate, had strongly urged him not to accept his role in the film because she felt, after reading the novel, that the subject matter was "too harrowing." Tucci's performance as Harvey earned him a nomination for the Academy Award for Best Supporting Actor, but lost to Christoph Waltz in Inglourious Basterds.
 Michael Imperioli as Detective Len Fenerman, the detective in charge of investigating Susie's death.
 Rose McIver as Lindsey Salmon, Susie's 13-year-old younger sister. She is the first to suspect that Harvey was involved in Susie's death. Jackson cast McIver particularly because she was an unknown actress. Mclver stated that she had read and been a fan of the novel before having been cast in the film.
 Christian Thomas Ashdale as Buckley Salmon, Susie's 4-year-old younger brother.
 Reece Ritchie as Ray Singh, Susie's love interest and friend who is strongly affected by Susie's death.
 Carolyn Dando as Ruth Connors, a classmate of Susie's. Jackson stated that, after he had searched all over the world for the role, he ultimately chose to cast Dando, a relatively unknown actress, who was working as a waitress before her casting.
 Charlie Saxton as Ronald Drake, one of the murder suspects.
 AJ Michalka as Clarissa, Susie's best friend who is dating Brian Nelson. Michalka was better known as a musician prior to her casting.
 Nikki SooHoo as Denise "Holly" Le Ang, Susie's best friend in Heaven and another of Harvey's victims.
 Jake Abel as Brian Nelson, Clarissa's boyfriend who beats up Jack believing him to be the murderer, stalking him and Clarissa.
 Thomas McCarthy as Principal Caden.

Production
In May 2000, Film4 Productions acquired feature film rights to Alice Sebold's novel The Lovely Bones, when it was a half-written manuscript. Producer Aimee Peyronnet had sought to attract studio interest to the manuscript, and an insider informed Film4's deputy head of production, Jim Wilson, of the project. The company attached Luc Besson and Peyronnet's production company Seaside to the project, two years before the novel's release. By February 2001, Lynne Ramsay was hired to direct and write the film adaptation of the novel. In July 2002, Channel 4 shut down Film4, causing Hollywood studios and producers to pursue acquisition of feature film rights to The Lovely Bones, which had spent multiple weeks at the top of the New York Times Best Seller list. The film adaptation, which had been estimated at a budget of $15 million, remained with Channel 4 under its newly developed inhouse film unit, with Ramsay still contracted to write and direct. By October 2002, Ramsay was writing the script with fellow screenwriter Liana Dognini, with filming planned for summer 2003. Author Sebold was invited by the producers to provide input on the project.

Ramsay, who had read the novel in manuscript prior to publication, said in 2012 that her adaptation departed from it significantly. The scenes with Susie in heaven would have been depicted purely as her father's imagination. He would have become friends with Mr. Harvey, never suspecting him of having killed his daughter. "I really didn't like the My Little Pony, she's-in-heaven, everything's-O.K. aspect", she told The New York Times in 2012.

In July 2003, the studio DreamWorks negotiated a first-look deal with producer Peyronnet, after DreamWorks co-founder Steven Spielberg expressed interest in the project. DreamWorks did not acquire the rights to the novel, and Ramsay was eventually detached from the project as, she says, FilmFour wanted a version more faithful to the novel. In April 2004, producers Peter Jackson, Fran Walsh, and Philippa Boyens entered negotiations to develop the project. Jackson described the book as "a wonderfully emotional and powerful story. Like all the best fantasy, it has a solid grounding in the real world." By January 2005, Jackson and Walsh planned to independently purchase film rights and to seek studio financing after a script had been developed. The producers sought to begin adapting a spec script for The Lovely Bones in January 2006, with the goal of script completion and budget estimation by the following May.

Jackson explained he enjoyed the novel because he found it "curiously optimistic" and uplifting because of the narrator's sense of humor, adding there was a difference between its tone and subject matter. He felt very few films dealt with the loss of a loved one. Jackson foresaw the most challenging element in the novel to adapt was the portrayal of Susie, the protagonist, in her heaven, and making it "ethereal and emotional but not hokey." Saoirse Ronan explained Jackson chose to depict the afterlife as depending on Susie's emotions. "Whenever Susie feels happy, Heaven is sunny and there's birds and everything. Whenever it's not so great, it's raining or she's in the middle of an ocean." Jackson described the book's description of "heaven" as being an "In-Between" rather than a true heaven and said he was not trying to paint a definitive picture of Heaven itself. "[W]hen Jackson created Susie's heaven, in a 1973 world, he went through the Partridge Family television show archives as a reference."

A 120-page draft of the script was written by September 2006. In April 2007, the script was completed by Jackson, Walsh and Boyens; Jackson intended to direct. The three producers began seeking a studio partner to finance the film adaptation. Besides the major studios, smaller companies including United Artists were also contacted. New Line Cinema was excluded from negotiations because of Jackson's legal dispute with the studio over royalties from his The Lord of the Rings trilogy. Jackson sought a beginning $65 million budget for The Lovely Bones, also requesting from studios what kind of promotional commitments and suggestions they would make for the film adaptation.

By May, four studios remained interested in the project: DreamWorks, Warner Bros., Sony, and Universal. The Lovely Bones was sold to DreamWorks for $70 million. Paramount Pictures received the rights to distribute the film worldwide. Production began in October 2007 in the U.S. state of Pennsylvania and New Zealand. Shooting in parts of Delaware, Chester and Montgomery counties, including Hatfield, Ridley Township, Phoenixville, Royersford, Malvern and East Fallowfield, lasted a few weeks, and most of the studio shooting was done in New Zealand.

In December 2008, Brian Eno signed on to compose the film's score. Fran Walsh, a big fan of his work, suggested him to Jackson. Jackson had called Eno to request use of two of his early tracks to evoke atmosphere for the 1970s scenes in the film. When Eno asked if he could compose the whole score, Jackson was surprised, since he had heard Eno did not like working on films. For the film's ending, Eno uncovered a demo he had done in 1973 and reunited with the vocalist to create a proper version for the film, commenting: "That song from 1973 was finally finished in 2008!"

In November 2009, Jackson stated that he re-shot new footage of Harvey's death scene after test audiences said it was not violent enough "to give people the satisfaction they needed". Jackson said it was important to him that the movie receive a PG-13 rating, so that the film could appeal to the widest possible audience, despite the necessarily violent nature of some scenes.

Release

Strategy

The Lovely Bones was originally scheduled for release on March 13, 2009, but it was delayed to December 11, 2009, as the studio became interested in releasing the film for "awards season," which gave Jackson an opportunity to make some effects shots larger in scope. The film then received a limited theater release on December 11, 2009, in the United States. The film was originally set to have a wider United States theater release on December 25, 2009 (Christmas Day), as part of a campaign to build its momentum into January 2010. In early December it was confirmed that the United States release date had been pushed back by three weeks to January 15, 2010. Paramount and DreamWorks did not give a reason for the change of the release date. The film premiered in New Zealand on December 26, 2009. The film had its UK premiere at the Royal Film Performance, an event held in aid of the Film & TV Charity, on November 24, 2009 at the ODEON Leicester Square. It was released in the United Kingdom on January 29 and in other countries in January 2010.

According to the Los Angeles Times, Paramount invested $70 million in production and an additional $85 million in worldwide marketing and distribution. In December 2009, the Los Angeles Times described the marketing and promotion of The Lovely Bones as having been a "heavy advertising campaign." In late July 2009, as part of the promotion, Jackson talked about the film and screened a 4 minute clip at the San Diego Comic-Con International film festival.

As part of marketing for the film, in August 2009, people were allowed to enter a contest to win a trip to Wellington, for the film's New Zealand premiere on December 14, 2009. The offer included, if the winner lived outside of Wellington, one night's accommodation and a voucher for flight or petrol to Wellington. A teaser trailer was released in August 2009, days before the film's official trailer. The official trailer debuted on the television series Entertainment Tonight and was released online shortly afterwards. In August 2009, Jackson offered a "behind-the-scenes look" at the film and discussed elements (mainly violence) in the film's plot line.

The Los Angeles Times reported that Paramount had originally expected the film to appeal to a "sophisticated, adult audience," but after poor revenue and average reviews, the studio decided to redirect the film to an audience in another age group. Surveys showed that the film was favored more by females aged 13–20 than by any other demographic. Paramount began to screen the movie "aggressively for high school- and college-age girls" during its three-screen limited release.

Box office
On December 11, 2009, the film was released on three screens in Los Angeles and New York. As of January 4, 2010, the film had grossed over $389,000 in the US. Claudia Eller and Ben Fritz of the Los Angeles Times felt that it did poorly at the box office in the first few weeks of its release because of average reviews and negative word-of-mouth. During its opening-weekend release on three screens, it earned over $116,616, an average of estimated $38,872 per-theater revenue. The film's revenue placed it at thirtieth place on the box office chart. In the film's second and third weeks of release, the film saw a decrease; in the fourth week, it had a 54.3-percent increase.

When put into wide release on January 15, 2010, it grossed $17,005,133 that weekend, ranking number three at the domestic box office. By the end of its run, The Lovely Bones had made $44,114,232 domestically, and $49,507,108 overseas, for a worldwide total of $93,621,340.

Home media
The film was released in the US on DVD and two-disc Blu-ray April 20, 2010 and in the United Kingdom on June 11, 2010.

Reception

Critical reception
Although Ronan and Tucci were praised for their performances, The Lovely Bones received mixed reviews from critics. On review aggregator Rotten Tomatoes, the film has a critics approval rating of 32%, based on 247 reviews, with an average rating of 5.00/10. The site's critical consensus reads, "It's stuffed full of Peter Jackson's typically dazzling imagery, but The Lovely Bones suffers from abrupt shifts between horrific violence and cloying sentimentality." Metacritic gave the film a score of 42 out of 100, based on 36 critics, indicating "mixed or average reviews".

Ian Freer of Empire gave the film 4/5 stars. Freer emphasized the "bold, daring original filmmaking, with arguably more emotional and intellectual meat to chew on than either the Rings trilogy or Kong." Freer noted that, like The Lord of the Rings, the film "does a fantastic job with revered, complex source material" and that, since it is "as terrific on terra firma as it is audacious in its astral plane", it is "doubtful" that there would be a "more imaginative" and "courageous film" in 2010.

Richard Corliss of Time wrote that "through [Peter] Jackson's art" and Ronan's "magic" the "obscenity of child murder has been invested with immense gravity and grace" and "like the story of Susie's life after death, that's a miracle." Peter Travers of Rolling Stone felt that the film was "conveyed" in a "remarkable performance" by Ronan and described Tucci as being "magnificent as a man of uncontrollable impulses" to "help Jackson cut a path to a humanity that supersedes life and death." Travers praised Jackson for building "jolting suspense." Despite praising the film, however, Travers noted that while the book "never flinched," the film does, and while the "business is being transacted" by Jackson with a "Lord of the Rings fantasy" the film "attunes himself to a family tragedy."

Claudia Puig of USA Today gave the film 2/4 stars, remarking that while "[Peter] Jackson gets the thriller scenes right", the "conceit of Susie trapped in a DayGlo world between the one she left and her final resting place, imparting lessons on coping with death, feels preachy." Puig also described the film as having "clashing tones" that veer from "lightheartedness to heavy-handedness." Puig also criticized the film's computer-generated imagery, describing it as being "cheesy" and felt that it broke "no ground." Kirt Honeycutt, of The Hollywood Reporter, described the film as telling "a fundamentally different story" which is "one that is not without its tension, humor and compelling details", but that "it's also a simpler, more button-pushing tale that misses the joy and heartbreak of the original." Honeycutt also described Jackson as having transformed Sebold's "startling, unique novel about the aftermath of a terrible murder" into a story that's more "focused on crime and punishment."

Stephanie Zacharek, of Salon, viewed the film as being "an expensive-looking mess that fails to capture the mood, and the poetry, of its source material" because "good actors fighting a poorly conceived script, under the guidance of a director who can no longer make the distinction between imaginativeness and computer-generated effects." Todd McCarthy, of Variety, felt that Jackson had undermined the "solid work from a good cast" with "show-offy celestial evocations" that "severely disrupt the emotional connections with the characters." McCarthy stated that he felt that the film, overall, was a "significant artistic disappointment." Joe Neumaier, of New York Daily News, described Jackson as having "siphoned out all the soulfulness" that made the author's "combination thriller/afterlife fantasy a best-seller" and that the film was "a gumball-colored potboiler that's more squalid than truly mournful." Neumaier also wrote that the film and Jackson "wasted" a "good cast." Roger Ebert of Chicago Sun-Times gave the film 1.5 stars out of 4, calling it "deplorable", and criticizing the apparent message that Susie's murder eventually made her happier. He was also critical of the film's portrayal of Heaven, which he compared to "a happy gathering of new Facebook friends". However, he praised the acting, stating that "this whole film is Jackson's fault".

According to the British Board of Film Classification (BBFC), the rating given to The Lovely Bones received 24 objections, more than any other movie in 2010. The BBFC report states, "Many found the film to be a shocking and upsetting experience. The scene in which young Susie is entrapped by the killer, and the subsequent sequence in which the killer soaks in a bath after the murder, were compared by some complainants to scenes in '18' rated horror films." The BBFC rated the movie a 12A, and many complained that the movie was upsetting for a younger audience. Nevertheless, the BBFC defended its rating: "The Lovely Bones lacked any explicit detail of the murder and any sexual elements were downplayed. The audience's sympathies remain entirely with the family and the film had many positive messages about life."

Accolades

See also
 List of ghost films

References

External links

 
 
 
 
 

2009 films
2009 crime drama films
American crime drama films
British crime drama films
New Zealand crime drama films
2000s English-language films
Films directed by Peter Jackson
Films with screenplays by Peter Jackson
Films with screenplays by Fran Walsh
Films with screenplays by Philippa Boyens
Films produced by Carolynne Cunningham
Films produced by Fran Walsh
Films produced by Peter Jackson
Films set in heaven
Films about grieving
Films based on American novels
Films set in 1973
Films set in Pennsylvania
Films shot in New Zealand
Films shot in Pennsylvania
American ghost films
American serial killer films
Films about spirit possession
Film4 Productions films
WingNut Films films
DreamWorks Pictures films
Paramount Pictures films
Films about rape
Casting controversies in film
Rating controversies in film
Obscenity controversies in film
Sexual-related controversies in film
Film controversies in the United Kingdom
Films about missing people
Films about father–daughter relationships
Magic realism films
Metaphysical fiction films
Limbo
2000s American films
2000s British films